The following highways are numbered 296:

Canada
 Quebec Route 296

Japan
 Japan National Route 296

United States
  Interstate 296 (unsigned)
  Arkansas Highway 296
  Florida State Road 296
  Georgia State Route 296
  Iowa Highway 296 (former unsigned highway)
  K-296 (Kansas highway) (former)
  Kentucky Route 296
  Minnesota State Highway 296 (former)
  Montana Secondary Highway 296
  New York State Route 296
  Ohio State Route 296
 Ohio State Route 296 (former)
  Pennsylvania Route 296
  South Carolina Highway 296
  South Dakota Highway 296 (former)
  Tennessee State Route 296
  Texas State Highway 296 (former proposed)
  Texas State Highway Loop 296 (former)
  Farm to Market Road 296
  Utah State Route 296
  Virginia State Route 296
  Wyoming Highway 296